Metinee Washington Kingpayome (born 1972), later Metinee Kingpayome Sharples, also known as Lukkade is a Thai-American actress, model, television presenter and beauty pageant titleholder who represented Thailand at Miss World 1992 and Miss World Asia & Oceania 1992.

Biography
The daughter of Thai father and American mother, Kingpayom was born in Maryland and raised in Queens, New York City. She has three younger brothers.

She won the Miss Thailand World title before she represented Thailand at the Miss World 1992 pageant in South Africa. There, she was crowned Continental Queen of Asia & Oceania. Her family now has moved back to Thailand.

She has since worked as a model, actress and TV presenter. She has been featured on the covers of Elle Thailand and Vogue Thailand. The Bangkok Post described her as: "At the forefront of the women's liberation movement in the Thai fashion industry,"

She was one of Channel V's first VJ presenters; and nominated Best Actress for Manya Ritsaya (1998). She subsequently won Supannahong Awards for her debut movie role in Box (1998).

She is also a mentor for The Face Thailand (season 1-4),The Face Men Thailand (season 1-2).

She established MUSE by METINEE with her brother Mark Kingpayom to teach students personality empowerment and growth-mindset development through catwalk and beauty queen techniques. The weekend course attracts students from across Thailand ages 4 and up with some senior students in their fifties, and offered an adapted curriculum as an after-school activity at Astra Academy International School in Bangkok.

She has one son, Skye Sharples.

TV dramas

Filmography

TV Program

Production 

Thailand's Perfect Man 2006 as Producer
Miss Universe Thailand 2019 as Head Master of Team Expert
Dancing with the Stars (2013) as Producer

References

External links 

 

Living people
1972 births
Metinee Kingpayom
Metinee Kingpayom
Miss World 1992 delegates
Metinee Kingpayom
Metinee Kingpayom
Models from New York City
Actresses from New York City
Metinee Kingpayom
Metinee Kingpayom
Metinee Kingpayom
Metinee Kingpayom
American people of Thai descent
Miss Thailand World